Protein CIP2A also known as cancerous inhibitor of PP2A (CIP2A) is a protein that in humans is encoded by the KIAA1524 gene.

Function 

Protein phosphatase 2A (PP2A) is a trimeric serine-threonine phosphatase consisting of a catalytic C-subunit (PP2Ac), a scaffolding A-subunit and various regulatory B-subunits. Importantly, it has been estimated that collectively PP2A complexes can dephosphorylate a vast majority of all cellular serine/threonine phosphorylated proteins including large number of phosphoproteins involved in cancer maintenance and progression. The functional role of PP2A as a human tumor suppressor was validated by studies initiated by the Weinberg laboratory, which demonstrated that normal human cells immortalized by overexpression of TERT and inhibition of p53 and Rb, could not be transformed by oncogenic forms of H-Ras without simultaneous inhibition of PP2A activity. These studies established the paradigm that increased activity of oncogenic kinases is not sufficient to drive human cell transformation if PP2A activity is not simultaneously inhibited.  In striking contrast to the tumor suppressor p53, which in human tumors is mainly inactivated by mutations, PP2A complex proteins are mutated at low frequency (http://www.cbioportal.org) and rather seem to be inhibited by overexpression of PP2A inhibitor proteins such as CIP2A, PME-1 and SET.

CIP2A inhibits PP2A tumor suppressor activity in human malignancies. More specifically, CIP2A was demonstrated to inhibit PP2A activity towards oncogenic transcription factor c-Myc, and thereby prevent c-Myc proteolytic degradation. Moreover, CIP2A is required for the malignant cellular growth and for in vivo tumor formation. In accordance with the oncogenic role of CIP2A, overexpression of CIP2A promotes Ras-elicited cell growth and transforms immortalized human cells (HEK-TERVs). More recently CIP2A has been shown to regulate phosphorylation and activity of many other oncoproteins and to drive malignant cell growth and tumorigenesis in various human cancer types. Importantly, CIP2A deficient mice are viable, suggesting that targeting of oncogenic function of CIP2A would not results in serious side-effects.

Clinical significance 

CIP2A is over-expressed in several common human malignancies including, human head and neck squamous cell carcinoma (HNSCC),  colon cancer, gastric cancer, breast cancer, prostate cancer and lung cancer. Notably, in these cancer types CIP2A over-expression is observed with very high frequency;  in breast cancer around 40% of cancer patients are over-expressing CIP2A whereas in all other studied cancer types the frequency is between 65-87 percent. In breast cancer CIP2A expression correlates with disease aggressivity whereas in gastric and lung cancer CIP2A expression predicts for poor patient survival. To date high CIP2A expression has been observed to predict poor patient prognosis in more than dozen human cancer types, which makes it one of the most frequently altered human oncoprotein with clinical relevance.

CIP2A is also over expressed in prostate cancer, lung cancer,  oral squamous cell carcinoma, and gastric cancer. Furthermore, the expression of CIP2A correlates with breast cancer aggressivity. It is also implicated in some Chronic Myeloid Leukemia (CML) resistance to imatinib (Gleevec).

References

 IL-10 promotes tumor aggressiveness via upregulation of CIP2A transcription in lung adenocarcinoma. Sung WW et al.,.  Clin Cancer Res. 2013 Aug 1;19(15):4092-103
 Senescence sensitivity of breast cancer cells is defined by positive feedback loop between CIP2A and E2F1. Laine A et al., Cancer Discov.2013 Feb;3(2):182-97
 CIP2A is a target of bortezomib in human triple negative breast cancer cells. Tseng LM et al. Breast Cancer Res. 2012 Apr 26;14(2):R68
 CIP2A promotes proliferation of spermatogonial progenitor cells and spermatogenesis in mice. Ventelä S et al., PLoS One.2012;7(3):e33209
 Cancerous inhibitor of PP2A (CIP2A) at diagnosis of chronic myeloid leukemia is a critical determinant of disease progression. Lucas CM et al., Blood. 2011 Jun 16;117(24):6660-8
 The dependence receptor UNC5H2/B triggers apoptosis via PP2A-mediateddephosphorylation of DAP kinase. Guenebeaud C, et al., Mol Cell. 2010 Dec 22;40(6):863-76 
 CIP2A mediates effects of bortezomib on phospho-Akt and apoptosis in hepatocellular carcinoma cells. Chen KF et al.,. Oncogene 2010 Nov 25;29(47):6257-66
 CIP2A is associated with human breast cancer aggressivity. Côme C, et al., Clin Cancer Res. 2009 Aug15;15(16):5092-100
 MYC-dependent regulation and prognostic role of CIP2A in gastric cancer. Khanna A, et al., J Natl Cancer Inst .2009 Jun 3;101(11):793-805
 CIP2A inhibits PP2A in human malignancies. Junttila MR, et al., Cell. 2007 Jul 13;130(1):51-62

Further reading